was a  after Tenpō and before Kaei. This period spanned the years from December 1844 through  February 1848.

Change of era
 December 2, 1844: The new era name of Kōka, meaning "Becoming Wide or Vast", was created to mark a fire at Edo Castle in Tenpō 15.

The nengo was not changed concurrent with the accession of Emperor Komei; instead, the Kōka era was retained until about a year after the new emperor was enthroned.

Events of the Kōka era
 1847 (Kōka 4): A major earthquake was recorded.
 1848 (Kōka 5): The last subscription noh of the premodern era.

During these years, Hiroshige began making a series of prints showing beautiful women in contexts of famous places.

Notes

References
 Keene, Donald. (2005). Emperor of Japan: Meiji and his world, 1852-1912. New York: Columbia University Press. ;  OCLC 57750432
 Nussbaum, Louis Frédéric and Käthe Roth. (2005). Japan Encyclopedia. Cambridge: Harvard University Press. ; OCLC 48943301

External links 

 National Diet Library, "The Japanese Calendar" -- historical overview plus illustrative images from library's collection

Japanese eras
1840s in Japan